Benarrabá is a town and municipality in the province of Málaga, part of the autonomous community of Andalusia in southern Spain. It has a population of approximately 600 residents. The natives are called Benarrabiches.

References

Municipalities in the Province of Málaga